V.A. Memorial Stadium is a baseball stadium located on the grounds of the Veterans Administration Hospital campus off of OH-104, three miles north of  Chillicothe, Ohio. It is officially designated as building 244.  The stadium is the home field of the Chillicothe Paints, a collegiate wooden bat baseball team in the Prospect League. Though primarily used for baseball, V.A. Memorial Stadium has been used for softball, soccer, and other non-sporting events. 

The stadium holds over 3000 people. The main grandstand is covered and constructed of concrete and brick. The seating in the grandstand consists of 12 rows of bench seats with the lower 6 rows having backrests. Additional seating includes metal bleachers along the first and third base lines and a party deck extending from just beyond third base to the left field corner. Until 2006 the playing surface consisted of natural grass and dirt. In 2006, Field Turf was installed.

Stadium history
The stadium was constructed in 1954 with funding from the Blue Star Mothers of America. It was originally used as a field for the patients of the VA Hospital to play softball.  

In 1993, the Frontier League began operations with the Chillicothe Paints playing in VA Memorial Stadium as one of the original 8 teams. The Paints organization with cooperation from the Department of Veterans Affairs renovated the stadium for the Paints opening game in June 1993.

In 2006 the Ross County Commissioners and Ross County Convention Facility Authority worked together to further renovate the stadium adding the left field party deck and Field Turf.

Stadium events
Chillicothe Paints, a collegiate summer baseball team that plays in the Prospect League
Mid-American Conference baseball tournament from 2008 to 2011
Great Lakes Intercollegiate Athletic Conference (GLIAC) Baseball Tournament, 2009–2011
Ohio High School Athletic Association (OHSAA) Division III District and Regional Baseball Tournament
North Coast Athletic Conference Baseball Championship Tournament
OHSAA regular season baseball and soccer games
Scenes from the 1999 movie A Little Inside were filmed in the stadium

References

External links
 Chillicothe Paints.com
 Prospect League Website

Baseball venues in Ohio
Softball venues in the United States
Buildings and structures in Chillicothe, Ohio
Tourist attractions in Ross County, Ohio
1955 establishments in Ohio
Sports venues completed in 1955
Soccer venues in Ohio